Totnes is a market town in South Devon, England.

Totnes may also refer to:

Totnes railway station
Totnes (Riverside) railway station
Totnes (UK Parliament constituency)
George Carew, 1st Earl of Totnes (1555–1629), an English nobleman

See also
Totness (disambiguation)
Tonnes (name)